Estigmene atrifascia is a moth of the family Erebidae. It was described by George Hampson in 1907. It is found in Kenya.

References

 

Endemic moths of Kenya
Spilosomina
Moths described in 1907